İleri (Turkish: literally Forward), was a Turkish newspaper founded on 1 January 1918 by Celal Nuri İleri (1877-1938) and his brother Suphi Nuri İleri (1887-1945).  It was initially published under the name Ati until 12 February 1919.

The newspaper supported the Turkish War of Independence. Articles written by modern Turkey's founder Atatürk were published anonymously by the newspaper. İleri became the voice of the Turkish national movement in İstanbul.  However, in 1920, the newspaper's founder, Celal Nuri, was arrested by the English in İstanbul and sent into exile.  The newspaper was published a total of 2436 issues until 2 December 1924. Publication was resumed by Suphi Nuri in 1944.

References

1918 establishments in the Ottoman Empire
1924 disestablishments in Turkey
Defunct newspapers published in the Ottoman Empire
Newspapers published in Istanbul
Publications established in 1918
Publications disestablished in 1924
Turkish-language newspapers
Defunct newspapers published in Turkey